Clark is the seventh studio album by British electronic musician Chris Clark and the fifth one under the moniker Clark. It was produced by Chris Clark and released on 3 November 2014 by Warp.

On its release the album reached number 20 on the Billboard Heatseakers chart, 17 on the Billboard Dance chart and 122 on the Belgian Album chart.

Track listing

Charts

References

2014 albums
Clark (musician) albums